Michele LaFong (born August 4, 1961) is a comedian, ventriloquist, and official protégé of the late Señor Wences.

Early life
Born and raised in Queens, New York, Michele has been making headlines in the United States and abroad. When asked when she first realized she was funny, Michele answers "I've been clowning around since day one. I've been thrown out of every school I ever went to. I just wasn't student material and could never conform as an adult. I lost lots of jobs too, as a rock-n-roll drummer, a bartender, and a hair dresser. I lost jobs I didn't even have!"

Career
A highlight of her career was to perform for renowned ventriloquist Señor Wences. In 1996, LaFong performed at his 100th birthday celebration at the New York Friars' Club. The centenarian was so impressed that he befriended LaFong and gave her his famous puppets Johnny and Pedro, plus taught her how to perform his classic routines.

LaFong is the only ventriloquist authorized by the Wences estate to perform Johnny and Pedro, as well as Wences' routines.

On Sept. 6, 2003, while driving on a highway and in a hurry, Michelle attempted to pass a transport truck and struck a car coming the other way, resulting in the death of the other car's driver; per Sin City ER episode air date 09-AUG-16.

References

1961 births
Living people
Ventriloquists